Amer may refer to:

Places
 Amer (river), a river in the Dutch province of North Brabant
 Amer, Girona, a municipality in the province of Girona in Catalonia, Spain
 Amber, India (also known as Amer, India), former city of Rajasthan state
 Amber Fort (also Amer Fort), India
 AMER, a country grouping that refers to America or the Americas

People
 Amer (name)
 Beni-Amer people, a mixed ethnic group inhabiting Sudan and Eritrea

Other uses
 Amer International Group, a Chinese company
 Amer Sports, a Finnish headquartered sporting goods company
 Amer (film), a 2009 Belgian-French thriller

See also
 Umerkot, a town in Sindh province of Pakistan